The pro-war Left was a grouping of British left wing journalists and bloggers who supported for the 2003 invasion of Iraq, at variance with much of the rest of the British Left, which opposed it. They were centered on the Euston manifesto. which in October 2007 had 2,929 signatories.  The name is derived from the pro-war group the Undertakers.

They have some similarity with American liberal hawks and Anti-Germans.

Supporters
The pro-war Left can be seen as mainly a phenomenon of the blogosphere. Most of its supporters contribute to or run blogs, Harry's Place being the most well known and influential of these.

On October 7, 2007, a counter-demonstration to the Al-Quds march was organised by Harry's Place to which all of the pro-war Left were invited. The organisers estimate that 100 people turned up over the course of the day.

As well as the Euston Manifesto there are other organisations that have been associated with the pro-war Left such as Labour Friends of Iraq, Unite Against Terror, Democratiya and Engage.

References

Further reading
 Decent Left, Neocon Europe profile.
 Norman Geras, Introducing the Euston Manifesto, The Guardian, 13 April 2006.
 Norman Geras and Nick Cohen, The Euston Manifesto, New Statesman, 17 April 2006.
 Geoffrey Wheatcroft, They should come out as imperialist and proud of it: There is a progressive tradition of support for colonialism, which the Euston manifesto group could champion, The Guardian, 10 May 2006.
 Norman Geras, The path out of denial, The Guardian, 25 May 2006.
 Mike Marqusee, The moral quicksand of the moral high ground, Comment is Free, guardian.co.uk, 14 April 2006.
 DD Guttenplan, No sects please, you're British, The Guardian, 17 April 2006.
 Daniel Davies, Next stop Euston. This manifesto terminates here, The Guardian, 14 April 2008
 Alan Johnson, The Euston Moment, guardian.co.uk, 21 April 2008.

Left-wing politics
Political movements
Politics of the United Kingdom